Sixteen Mile Creek is a stream in the municipalities of Lincoln, Pelham and West Lincoln, Regional Municipality of Niagara in Southern Ontario, Canada. It is part of the Great Lakes Basin and flows from the top of the Niagara Escarpment to Sixteen Mile Pond on Lake Ontario. The stream falls within the remit of the Niagara Peninsula Conservation Authority, whose 2012 watershed report card gave the stream watershed grades of D for both water quality and forest cover.

References

Sources

Tributaries of Lake Ontario
Rivers of the Regional Municipality of Niagara